The 1984 Austrian Grand Prix was a Formula One motor race held at Österreichring on 19 August 1984.

The 51-lap race was won by local driver Niki Lauda, driving a McLaren-TAG. Brazilian Nelson Piquet finished second in a Brabham-BMW, having started from pole position, with Italian Michele Alboreto third in a Ferrari. The win, Lauda's fourth of the season, gave him the lead of the Drivers' Championship by 4.5 points from his French teammate Alain Prost, who spun out shortly after half distance.

Report
The race had to be stopped soon after the first start, due to a problem with the starting lights which caused chaos among the drivers with Niki Lauda claiming that he saw "Red, green, yellow then red again". This caused 3rd fastest qualifier Elio de Angelis to hesitate badly off the line and his Lotus-Renault was almost hit from behind by several cars and saw the Toleman-Hart of Ayrton Senna in 4th place by the time they reached Hella-Licht after starting 10th. On the formation lap for the re-start, pole sitter Piquet, who had seen the McLarens change tyres on the grid, angered the other drivers when he led the field on an extremely slow lap in an effort to not allow Prost or Lauda to scrub in their new Michelin rubber.

Alain Prost, Lauda's team mate and the World Championship leader going into the race, failed to finish after spinning off on oil at the Jochen Rindt Curve on lap 28, that came from the Lotus of Elio de Angelis when his Renault engine failed moments before Prost retired. Prost had been running a close second behind Piquet at the time of his spin. Piquet came upon the oil of de Angelis first and managed to keep his car from sliding off despite a twitch on the oil. Prost however was having gear selection problems and hit the oil with one hand on his steering wheel and the other on his gear lever, spinning off into retirement. Lauda moved into second and then passed Piquet for the lead, the Brazilian suffering tyre trouble. Despite a brief gearbox problem, Lauda went on to win his home race by 23 seconds.

Another Austrian driver Gerhard Berger, who would go on to win 10 Grands Prix before retiring at the end of the  season, made his Formula One debut at the Österreichring, finishing 12th and last in his ATS-BMW. The third Austrian in the race, Jo Gartner, retired after only 6 laps with engine troubles in his Osella-Alfa Romeo.

Both Renaults retired with engine failures, Derek Warwick on lap 18 and Patrick Tambay on lap 43.

Classification

Qualifying

Race

Championship standings after the race 

Drivers' Championship standings

Constructors' Championship standings

References

Austrian Grand Prix
Grand Prix
Austrian Grand Prix
Austrian Grand Prix